Dwr-y-Felin Comprehensive School (Welsh: Ysgol Gyfun Dŵr-y-Felin) is a comprehensive school in the Cwrt Herbert community of the town of Neath in South Wales, Wales. The school badge shows a watermill and mill stream in reference to the school name, in English 'water of the mill' or 'mill stream'.  The badge also uses the acronym DCS to represent Dwr-y-Felin Comprehensive School.

Admissions
The school is co-educational, for pupils aged 11–16. As a comprehensive school, there is no admission criteria beyond residence in the local 'catchment' area,

It is situated on Dwr-y-Felin Road, off the A474 next to Neath Port Talbot College (former Neath College before 1996) and close to the former Nidum Roman fort.

History

Former schools
The school can trace its origin back to 1894 when following the Welsh Intermediate Education Act 1889 an Intermediate and Technical School for 200 scholars was established  to serve the population of Neath. The names Neath Boys Grammar School and Neath Girls Grammar School were adopted following the post-WWII introduction  of the tri-partite education system. Prior to that the schools had the name 'county school' as they were administered by the local (county) authority; "Neath County School" can still be seen over the old staff entrance to the school. In 1953, also under the tri-partite education system, Rhydhir Secondary Modern School was established.

Neath Boys Grammar School was noted for producing many well-known rugby players and for its music (in particular an orchestra composed of now very successful and notable musicians). Neath Girls' Grammar School was also notable for its music and the achievements of its alumnae. The grammar school motto was Gorau Arf, Arf Dysg ('The best weapon is the weapon of learning')

Comprehensive
The school opened its doors for the first time in September 1973 following the ending of grammar school education in the Neath area. The Upper School was housed on Dwr-y-Felin Road in the buildings of the former Neath Grammar School adjacent to Neath Port Talbot College, while the Lower School was situated on the campus of the former Rhydhir Secondary Modern school in Longford, Neath Abbey. Since a site amalgamation which took place on 6 September 2012, all school facilities are located at the former Upper School, with an extra building having been constructed at a cost of 9.7 million pounds.

Headteachers
The inaugural Headteacher was Dr R.J. Graham, previously the Headteacher of Neath Grammar School for Boys. Mai Edwards (1926-2017), the Headmistress of Neath Girls' Grammar School became Headteacher of the new Cefn Saeson Comprehensive School.  Dr Graham left circa 1987–89. Dr D. Stokes was the Headteacher of Dwr y Felin Comprehensive School from the mid  1980s until August 2002.

Mr N. Stacey was appointed Headteacher in September 2002. 2012 brought a new Head Teacher to Dwr-y-Felin as Mr. Stacey made his sad departure, when Mrs S.E. Handley, a previous history teacher and assistant head took over the role until August 2019. In September 2019 Deputy Headteacher Mrs P.J. Peet was appointed Headteacher as Mrs. Handley retired.

Notable former pupils

Neath Boys Grammar School

 Gordon Back, musician
 John Bevan, Wales international rugby player and coach
 Kevin Bowring, rugby player and Wales international coach
 Cynog Dafis, Plaid Cymru MP from 1992 to 2000 for Ceredigion (Ceredigion and Pembroke North from 1992 to 1997)
 Arthur Hickman, Wales international rugby player, later league professional
 Wynne Hooper, professional footballer with Newport County
 T. G. H. James, Egyptologist, Editor from 1960 to 1970 of the Journal of Egyptian Archaeology
 Roy John, Wales internationsal soccer player
 Tony Lewis, England and Glamorgan cricket captain, writer and broadcaster, chairman of Wales Tourist Board, chairman of Welsh National Opera
 Clive Leyman, chief aerodynamicist (with Jean Rech) of Concorde
 Courtney Meredith, Wales international rugby player
 Clive Norling, international rugby union referee
 Harry Parr-Davies, songwriter and composer
 David (Dai) Richards, Wales international rugby player
 Michael Roberts, Conservative MP from 1970 to 1974 for Cardiff North, and from 1974 to 1983 for Cardiff North West
 Oliver Sims, computer scientist
 David Shufflebotham, cricketer
 Brian Thomas, Cambridge Rugby Blue (Christ's) and Wales international rugby player
 Gwyn Thomas, cricketer
 Andrew Vicari, artist
 Cyril Walters, England test cricketer and captain

Neath Girls Grammar School
 Della Jones, mezzo-soprano, sang Rule, Britannia! at the 1993 Last Night of the Proms (with John Tomlinson)
 Melveena McKendrick (nee Jones), Professor of Spanish Golden-Age Literature, Culture and Society from 1999 to 2008, and married to Neil McKendrick

Dwr-y-Felin Comprehensive School

 Chris Bromham, stuntman
 Katherine Jenkins – international opera singer
 Paul James - Wales international rugby player, Ospreys
 David Melding, Conservative AM for South Wales Central
 Craig Mitchell - Wales international rugby player, Ospreys
 David Pickering - Wales international rugby player and current chairman Welsh Rugby Union
 Jonathan Spratt - Wales international rugby player, Ospreys
 Ashley Beck - Wales international rugby player, Ospreys

References

External links
 Dwr-y-Felin Comprehensive School's website

News items
 Roman dig in playing fields in February 2011

Secondary schools in Neath Port Talbot
1973 establishments in Wales
Educational institutions established in 1973
Neath